Friedländer (Friedlander, or Friedlaender) is a toponymic surname derived from any of German places named Friedland.

The surname may refer to:

People

Friedländer 
 Adolf Albrecht Friedländer (1870–1949), Austrian neurologist and psychiatrist
 Adolph Friedländer (1851–1904), German lithographer, printer of circus posters and magazines
 Albert Friedländer (1888–1966), German bank director, later French and Swiss author
 Benedict Friedlaender (1866–1908), German sexologist, sociologist, and physicist
 Carl Friedländer (1847–1887), German pathologist and microbiologist
 David Friedländer (1750–1834), German writer, manufacturer
 Eitan Friedlander (born 1958), Israeli Olympic sailor
 Friedrich Friedländer (1825–1901), Czech-German Jewish painter
 Gerhart Friedlander (1916–2009), German chemist
 György Szepesi-Friedländer (1922), Hungarian radio personality and sports executive
 Johnny Friedlaender (1912–1992), graphic artist, painter
 Julius Friedländer (disambiguation)
 Ludwig Friedländer (1824–1909), German philologist
 Margot Friedländer (born 1921), German survivor of the Holocaust
 Marguerete Friedländer (1896–1985), German and American ceramist
 Max Friedländer (disambiguation)
 Max Jakob Friedländer (1867–1958), German museum curator and art historian
 Michael Friedländer (1833–1910), Orientalist and principal of Jews' College, London
 Michael W. Friedlander (1928–2021), American physicist
 Oskar Friedländer, Austrian philosopher
 Paul Friedländer (disambiguation)
 Rebecca Friedländer (1783-1850), German novelist and short-story writer
 Richard Friedländer (1881–1939), German Jewish merchant
 Salomo Friedlaender (1871–1946), German philosopher
 Saul Friedländer (born 1932), Israeli historian
 Vera Friedländer (1928–2019), German writer and Holocaust survivor
 Walter Friedländer (1873–1966), art historian

Friedlander 
 Albert Friedlander (1927–2004), American rabbi
 Beau Friedlander, American writer, publisher, and media consultant
 Camilla Friedländer (1862–1928), Austrian painter
 Dagobert Friedländer (1826–1904), banker and member of the House of Lords of Prussia
 Elizabeth Friedländer (1903–1984), German born designer
 Eric Friedlander (born 1944), American mathematician
 Erik Friedlander (born 1960), American musician
 Ernie Friedlander (born 1935), Holocaust survivor and is Australian-Jewish activist
 Erwin Friedlander (1925–2004), American expert in high-energy nuclear physics
 Frederick Gerard Friedlander (1917–2001), German British mathematician
 Günther Friedländer (1902–1975), pharmacist, botanist, pharmacognosist, food chemist, and industrialist
 Hans-Peter Friedländer (1920–1999), Swiss football forward
 Hedwig Friedländer (1856–1937), Austrian painter
 Henry Friedlander (1930–2012), German-American historian
 Hugo Friedlander (1850s–1928), New Zealand businessman and local politician
 Isaac Friedlander (1823–1878), wheat broker and California land speculator
 Israel Friedlander (1876–1920), American rabbi
 John Friedlander, Canadian mathematician
 Judah Friedlander (born 1969), American comedian
 Judith Friedlander, Professor of anthropology
 Julius Reinhold Friedlander (1803–1839), German-American educator
 Kate Friedlander (1902–1949), psychoanalyst
 Lanny Friedlander (1947–2011), American publisher
 Lee Friedlander (born 1934), American photographer
 Lee Friedlander (film director), American film director
 Leo Friedlander (1888–1966), American sculptor
 Leslie Friedlander, cantor
 Louis Friedlander (1901–1962), American independent film and television director known as Lew Landers
 Liz Friedlander, American film, music video and television director
 Marcus Friedlander, American rabbi
 Marti Friedlander (1928–2016), New Zealand photographer
 Matthew Friedlander (born 1979), South African cricketer
 Michael Friedlander (disambiguation)
 Miriam Friedlander (1914–2009), American politician
 Michal Friedlander, cultural historian and museum curator
 Mona Friedlander (1914–1993), British pilot
 Noam Friedlander, American author
 Shems Friedlander (born 1940), American Islamic scholar, Sufi master, visual artist, filmmaker, author and professor
 Susan Friedlander (born 1946), American mathematician
 Tony Friedlander (born 1944), New Zealand politician 
 Tzvi Hersh Friedlander, Liske Hasidic rebbe
 William B. Friedlander (1884–1968), American songwriter and theater producer

Friedlaender 
 Ann Fetter Friedlaender (1938–1992), American economist
 Henri Friedlaender (1904–1996), Israeli typographer and book designer
 Helmut Friedlaender (1913–2008), American lawyer, financial adviser, and book collector

Characters 
 Isiah Friedlander, minor character from Grand Theft Auto V
 Sharon Friedlander, Marvel Comics character

Yiddish-language surnames
German-language surnames
German toponymic surnames